Bowen Yang (born November 6, 1990) is an Australian-born American actor, comedian, writer, singer, rapper, and podcaster based in New York City. Yang was hired to join the writing staff of the NBC sketch comedy series Saturday Night Live in September 2018, ahead of its 44th season, and a year later, in September 2019, he was promoted to on-air cast status for SNL's 45th season as a featured player alongside Chloe Fineman, becoming its first Chinese-American, first Australian-American, third openly gay male, and fourth-ever cast member of Asian descent. He made history becoming the first SNL featured player to be nominated for a Primetime Emmy Award in 2021. He was promoted to repertory status before the 47th season. He co-hosts a comedy pop-culture podcast, Las Culturistas, with Matt Rogers.

Yang has appeared in the television series Girls5Eva, Ziwe, and The Other Two, and is a cast member on Awkwafina is Nora from Queens. He is also known for his appearances in the LGBTQ romantic comedies Fire Island and Bros, both released in 2022.

Early life and education 
Yang was born in Brisbane, Queensland, Australia, to a family that had emigrated from China in the 1980s. His father, Ruilin, was raised in a rural part of the Inner Mongolia region of mainland China, growing up in a straw and mud hut. Ruilin's parents were illiterate, but he read books for hours by candlelight and eventually got into university. Yang's mother is an obstetrician-gynaecologist. The couple moved to Brisbane so Ruilin could earn his doctorate in mining explosives.

Yang has an older sister, Yang Yang. The children spoke Mandarin in their home, and attended Chinese Sunday school. When Yang was six months old, the family moved to Canada and eventually settled in Montreal, where Bowen first discovered Saturday Night Live (SNL). When he was nine, they moved again to Aurora, Colorado. As a child, he was drawn to late-night comedians and hosts David Letterman and Conan O’Brien.

Yang's high school calculus teacher, Adrian Holguin, was also his coach for Smoky Hill High School's improvisational comedy group, Spontaneous Combustion.  Yang got a near perfect score on the ACT (a 35) and a 2200 on his SAT, and graduated from high school in 2008. He was named homecoming king and also voted "Most Likely to Be a Cast Member on Saturday Night Live" in his high school's yearbook.

When he was seventeen, Yang's father found out his son was gay from an "open chat window" on the family's computer. His parents were not receptive to the news, stating that such things "did not happen in China". Yang's father cried often over the revelation and, being non-religious but wanting to "solve problems", arranged for him to attend eight sessions of gay conversion therapy. Bowen attended the conversion therapy to appease his parents, and recalls being immediately alarmed by the counselor's mix of religion and use of pseudo-scientific reasoning to explain away positive homosexual manifestations. In an interview for The New York Times, Maureen Dowd questioned why his parents, both scientists, did not see the disconnection. Bowen said, "It was a cultural thing for them, this cultural value around masculinity, around keeping the family line going, keeping certain things holy and sacred," he said "It was me wanting to meet them halfway but realizing it had to be pretty absolute. It was an either-or thing."

Yang moved to New York in 2008 to attend New York University (NYU) like his older sister. His father assigned her to chaperone him during this period as Bowen tried "straightness on for size and failing miserably." He came to accept being gay, incorporating it into his comedy, and hoped his parents would learn to accept that aspect of him. They have since found a truce and enjoy a "great relationship."

Yang was inspired by Sandra Oh's character Cristina Yang on Grey's Anatomy for her neurotic and relentless pursuits, and aspired to be a doctor. He went to pre-med classes and graduated from NYU with a bachelor's degree in chemistry. Yang's college major has been misreported as microbiology. After realizing he was actually inspired by Oh for her acting ability, he decided to pursue a career in comedy instead. At NYU, he met Matt Rogers, with whom he started Las Culturistas, a weekly comedy podcast where Yang "unapologetically expresses his personality, story and himself by sharing his experiences as a member of the LGBTQ community".

Career

Early career 
Yang taught himself Adobe Photoshop and graphic design software and later worked at One Kings Lane, a luxury interior and home design website, from 2013 to 2018 as a graphic designer. The company was woman-centered, and was flexible with Yang's time-off needs for comedy. He was on the improv team, Dangerbox. Yang has also performed improv at the Upright Citizens Brigade. During this time, Yang designed graphics for his own shows and for his friends' comedy shows.

The podcast that Yang co-hosts with Matt Rogers, Las Culturistas, is described by Vulture as both "delightfully screwy" and a "two-headed snark routine". Each one opens with an interview with a pop culture guest, then goes to one-minute rounds of "I Don't Think So, Honey!" (IDTSH) where the hosts and guests each expound on pet peeves. IDTSH has also morphed into its own live show. Yang credits the Las Culturistas podcast with Rogers for building his fanbase. In 2018 it was nominated for a Shorty Award recognizing the best in social media. Yang appeared in shows such as Comedy Central's Broad City, a Vimeo web series The Outs, and the HBO web comedy High Maintenance. He was a supporting cast member in the 2019 film Isn't It Romantic. Yang performed stand-up on HBO's 2 Dope Queens. He played fashion designer Alexander Wang in a sketch series on Comedy Central, Up Next.

In 2019, Yang received press coverage for his viral Twitter posts consisting of "expertly-timed lip-sync videos of famous movie scenes", in which he "reproduces dialogue from diva scenes" and well-known moments in popular culture. Past videos featured a monologue by Miranda Priestly in The Devil Wears Prada, Tyra Banks yelling at contestant Tiffany Richardson on America's Next Top Model, and a viral video of Cardi B talking about the 2019 government shutdown. Each garnered thousands of likes and retweets.

In January 2019, he was named to Forbes magazine's 30 Under 30 Hollywood & Entertainment list.

Saturday Night Live

As writer: 2018 
In 2018, Yang was hired as a staff writer on Saturday Night Live for the show's 44th season. He said he "always loved SNL growing up, but had trouble imagining himself on the show, because he'd never seen people who looked like him associated with the series". Yang has writing credits on twenty-one episodes of the show for the 2018–2019 season. His writing included: "GP Yass", a play on a vehicle's GPS navigation device that utilizes drag queens to deliver driving directions; and two sketches co-written with Julio Torres, which features Yang's talent for infusing "drama, tension, and exquisite backstory" into an everyday activity like paying bills in "Cheques" with Sandra Oh, and an actress doing a cameo in a gay pornography film, "The Actress" with Emma Stone. "The Actress" was hailed by Out as the "gayest SNL sketch of all-time," and featured Stone as an earnest method actress taking her role as a cheated-on housewife too seriously alongside real-life gay porn actor Ty Mitchell. The pre-tape—so-called as it is filmed days ahead rather than acted live—was championed by Stone to be included on air. SNL creator Lorne Michaels knew Yang would be an on-air talent but wanted him to be comfortable on their stage first. Yang made a cameo appearance during the Sandra Oh/Tame Impala episode as North Korean leader Kim Jong-Un while Oh played his translator.

As on-air cast: 2019–present 
In September 2019, Yang was promoted to featured cast member for the 45th season, alongside improviser Chloe Fineman, both of whom were promoted to repertory status at the start of the show's 47th season in September 2021. Yang is the show's first ever Chinese-American cast member, and third openly gay male cast member after Terry Sweeney and John Milhiser.

SNL has had "little representation from Asian actors, as cast members or hosts" over several decades. Up until Yang's promotion there had been only three cast members, and six hosts who were of Asian descent. A 2016 study of SNL revealed: 90% of 1975–2016's show hosts (826 total) were white, 6.8% were black, 1.2% were Hispanic, and 1.1% were labelled "other". Similarly SNL has had comparatively low representation of LGBTQ on-air cast and guest hosts since the series started in 1975. Yang is the third openly gay male, and sixth LGBTQ cast member. News of the Chinese and openly gay Yang's new job was reported internationally, but within hours was overshadowed by revelations that comedian Shane Gillis, who had been hired at the same time, aired homophobic and anti-Asian jokes. Gillis issued an apology, but within days was fired by SNL.

Yang's first episode as a regular cast member was the season's opening episode September 28, 2019, with host Woody Harrelson. Notably he was included in the show's cold open playing Kim Jong-un giving advice to Trump on handling the Ukraine controversy including the whistleblower who helped trigger the 2019 impeachment hearings. In other sketches he portrayed Democratic presidential candidate Andrew Yang in a parody town hall debate, and was an extra in a mock movie trailer for Downton Abbey. In October 2019, Yang made his debut on Weekend Update (WU), as Chinese trade representative Chen "Trade Daddy" Biao in a segment about Donald Trump's trade war that was "brief, funny and took some clever satirical shots". Yang's Biao character returned to WU as the newly appointed health minister for the COVID-19 pandemic which he unconvincingly tries to assure China has in control. Perhaps his "filthiest" sketch, also co-written with friend Julio Torres, was for guest host Harry Styles as an incompetent Sara Lee Corporation social media manager who mixes up his own gay BDSM account on Instagram with the company's "wholesome bread brand". He was listed #2 in Variety's Power of Pride list of most influential queer artists in Hollywood in 2021. The same year, Yang was nominated for a Primetime Emmy Award for Outstanding Supporting Actor in a Comedy Series. He is the first featured player to ever be nominated. He also played NBA hall-of-famer Yao Ming in January 2022.

In 2021, Yang was applauded for speaking out on the recent surge in violence against Asian-Americans during a Weekend Update segment. He told audiences to "fuel up" (using the Chinese cheer Jiayou) and do more for Asian Americans. Also in 2021, he appeared on the Time 100, Times annual list of the 100 most influential people in the world.

Other work 
Yang plays Nora Lin (portrayed by Awkwafina)'s mobile app-developer cousin in the Comedy Central sitcom Awkwafina Is Nora from Queens, which premiered in January 2020 and was renewed for a third season in 2022.

Yang is a writer on the Apple TV+ musical comedy series Schmigadoon! , which stars his former SNL castmate Cecily Strong. In September 2021, he appeared as a guest on the NPR news quiz Wait Wait... Don't Tell Me!. In 2022 he starred in Fire Island, written by and co-starring his close friend Joel Kim Booster, whom he met at the beginning of his comedy career. He appeared in the 2022 film Bros and is part of the cast of F*cking Identical Twins with Aaron Jackson, Josh Sharp, and Megan Thee Stallion.

Filmography

Film

Television

Writer

Accolades
 2019 – Forbes 30 Under 30 Hollywood & Entertainment list
 2019 – Out 100 Entertainer of the Year list
 2021 – People Sexiest Man Alive
 2021 – Variety Power of Pride list
 2021 – Time 100 Most Influential People

See also 
 Chinese people in New York City
 LGBT culture in New York City
 List of LGBT people from New York City

Explanatory notes

References

External links 
 
 

1990 births
Living people
21st-century American comedians
21st-century American male actors
21st-century American male writers
21st-century LGBT people
American comedians of Asian descent
American gay actors
American gay writers
American sketch comedians
American male actors of Chinese descent
American male comedians
American male film actors
American male television actors
American male voice actors
American podcasters
Australian emigrants to Canada
Australian emigrants to the United States
Australian people of Chinese descent
Comedians from Colorado
Comedians from New York City
Gay comedians
American LGBT people of Asian descent
LGBT people from Colorado
LGBT people from New York (state)
Male actors from Brisbane
Male actors from Colorado
Male actors from New York City
American LGBT rights activists
New York University alumni
People from Aurora, Colorado
American LGBT comedians
Australian LGBT comedians